Liechtenstein competed at the 2014 Winter Olympics in Sochi, Russia, from 7 to 23 February 2014. Liechtenstein's Olympic Committee nominated 4 athletes for the Olympics.

Alpine skiing 

According to the quota allocation released on 20 January 2014, Liechtenstein has seven athletes in qualifying position. However the National Olympic Committee only decided to send three athletes. Weirather had to withdraw from the combined, and then the downhill after suffering a bone bruise on her knee and shin. She eventually was forced to withdraw from the Super-G as well.

Cross-country skiing 

According to the quota allocation released on 20 January 2014, Liechtenstein has one athlete in qualification position.

Distance

References

External links 
Liechtenstein at the 2014 Winter Olympics

Nations at the 2014 Winter Olympics
2014
2014 in Liechtenstein sport